The Los Angeles Lakers joined the National Basketball Association (NBA) in the 1948–49 BAA season as the Minneapolis Lakers, but moved to Los Angeles for the 1959–60 NBA season, where they have been located ever since. They play their home games at Staples Center, which they share with fellow NBA team the Los Angeles Clippers. The Minneapolis Lakers took its official name from Minnesota's nickname, Land of 10,000 Lakes. The NBA started as the Basketball Association of America (BAA).

To help the Lakers acquire local players, territorial picks were instituted from its inception in 1950 until 1965. Territorial picks were used as a type of special draft choice used in the NBA Draft. Prior to the league's draft, a team could forfeit its first-round draft pick and select a player from within . Territorial picks were then eliminated when the draft was revamped in 1966. Before the 1989 NBA draft, the draft had more than two rounds. After 1989, the NBA agreed with the National Basketball Players' Association to limit drafts to two rounds. Teams can also trade their picks, so some years a team could have more than or less than two picks.

The Lakers selected Chuck Hanger with their first pick, ninth overall in the 1948 BAA draft. The Lakers got their first overall draft pick in 1958 by choosing Elgin Baylor, who went on to be selected as the only NBA Rookie of the Year to be on the Lakers. The Lakers also drafted Magic Johnson in 1979 with their second first overall pick, who was rated the greatest NBA point guard of all time by ESPN in 2007. The Lakers had no first-round draft picks in 1967, 1976, 1978, 1980, 2008, 2010, 2011, 2012 and 2013. The Lakers had no first or second-round draft picks from 1983, 1987, and 2001. Throughout the years, the Lakers had traded away some of their picks as well as traded for other teams' picks. As a result of the various trades, the Los Angeles Lakers had five first and second-round picks in 1979.

Key

Selections

Footnotes

 The Lakers traded Tom Hawkins to Cincinnati for a future draft pick (Jim King).
 The Lakers traded Rick Roberson to Cleveland for a future draft pick (Jim Price) and cash.
 The Lakers traded John Tresvant to Baltimore for a future draft pick (Paul Stovall).
 The Lakers traded Jim Cleamons to Cleveland for a future draft pick (Kermit Washington).
 The Lakers traded Flynn Robinson to Baltimore for future considerations.
 The Lakers traded Pat Riley to Phoenix in exchange for two future draft picks (Earl Tatum and ?).
 The Lakers traded Melvin Calvin to San Antonio for 1977 first-round draft pick (Brad Davis) and cash.
 The Lakers traded Lucius Allen to Kansas City for Ollie Johnson and a first and second round (Lew Massey) draft picks in 1978.
 The Lakers traded Charlie Scott to Denver for Ron Boone and two second-round draft picks (Victor King and Butch Carter).
 The Lakers traded Tom Abernethy to Buffalo for a second-round draft pick (Mark Young).
 The Lakers traded Kenny Carr for two second-round draft picks (Wayne Robinson and Harvey Knuckles).
 The Lakers traded Don Ford and a first-round draft pick (Chad Kinch) to Cleveland in exchange for Butch Lee and a first-round draft pick in the 1982 draft (James Worthy).
 The Lakers traded Mike Smrek to San Antonio for a 1990 second-round draft pick (Tony Smith).
 The Lakers traded Doug Christie to New York in exchange for two second-round draft picks (Paul Rogers and ?).
 The Lakers traded George Lynch and Anthony Peeler to Vancouver in exchange for future considerations.
 The Lakers traded draft rights to Toby Bailey to the Phoenix Suns in exchange for future considerations.
 The Lakers traded Lindsey Hunter and draft rights to Chris Jefferies in exchange for Tracy Murray and draft rights to Kareem Rush.

 The Lakers have traded guard Kareem Rush to the Charlotte Bobcats for two future second-round draft picks (Ronny Turiaf and Patrick Beverley). The Bobcats have acquired a second-round pick (Ronny Turiaf) in the 2005 NBA Draft from Atlanta in exchange for forward/center Predrag Drobnjak. Atlanta Hawks acquired centers Michael Doleac (from the New York Knicks) and Joel Przybilla (from the Milwaukee Bucks), along with a 2005 second-round pick from the Knicks (Ronny Turiaf), while sending center Nazr Mohammed to the Knicks in the three-way trade.
 The Lakers have acquired forward Lamar Odom, forward Caron Butler, forward Brian Grant and a future first-round draft pick (Jordan Farmar) from the Miami Heat in exchange for center Shaquille O'Neal.
 The Lakers traded draft rights to center Cheikh Samb in exchange for Maurice Evans.
 The Lakers have traded forward Jumaine Jones to the Charlotte Bobcats for a 2007 second-round draft pick (Sun Yue).
 The Lakers traded draft rights to Toney Douglas to the New York Knicks in exchange for a 2011 second-round draft choice (Andrew Goudelock) and cash considerations.
 The Lakers traded draft rights to Patrick Beverley to the Miami Heat in exchange for a 2011 second-round draft pick (Ater Majok) and cash considerations.
 The Lakers traded forward Kwame Brown, guard Javaris Crittenton, guard Aaron McKie, the draft rights to Marc Gasol, and first-round picks in 2008 (Donté Greene) and 2010 (Greivis Vásquez) to Memphis in exchange for Pau Gasol and a second round draft choice in 2010 (Devin Ebanks).
 The Lakers traded guard Sasha Vujacic and a 2011 first-round draft pick (JaJuan Johnson) to New Jersey in exchange for forward Joe Smith and two second-round draft picks (Darius Morris & Chicago's second-round pick in 2012) along with the draft rights to Sergei Lishchuk from Houston.
 The Lakers traded draft rights to Chukwudiebere Maduabum to the Denver Nuggets in exchange for a future second-round draft pick.

References
General
 
 
 
 

Specific

 
 
National Basketball Association draft
Los Angeles Heat first and second round draft picks
draft history